"Tacky Tattoo" is a song by Dundee band The View. It was released on 2 December 2012 with "Hold On Now" as a double A-side single. It follows the singles "How Long" and "The Clock" and is taken from the band's fourth album Cheeky For A Reason.

Track listing
Digital Download, 7" Vinyl, CD Single
 "Tacky Tattoo (Radio Edit)" - 3:02
 "Hold On Now (Radio Edit)" - 3:01
 "Addicted (Amy Winehouse Cover)" - 2:33

References

2011 singles
The View (band) songs
2011 songs
Cooking Vinyl singles
Songs written by Kyle Falconer
Songs written by Kieren Webster